Bokhansky District (Bookhonoi aimag) is an administrative district of Ust-Orda Buryat Okrug of Irkutsk Oblast, Russia, one of the thirty-three in the oblast. Municipally, it is incorporated as Bokhansky Municipal District. It is located in the south of the oblast. Its administrative center is the rural locality (a settlement) of Bokhan. Population:  26,897 (2002 Census);  The population of Bokhan accounts for 20.4% of the district's total population.

References

Notes

Sources

Registry of the Administrative-Territorial Formations of Irkutsk Oblast 

Districts of Irkutsk Oblast